Microlicia is a genus of flowering plants in the family Melastomataceae, native to northern South America, particularly Brazil. They tend to be subshrubs.

Species
Currently accepted species include:

Microlicia agrestis Cogn.
Microlicia amblysepala Ule
Microlicia amplexicaulis Cogn.
Microlicia arenariifolia DC.
Microlicia aurea Wurdack
Microlicia avicularis Mart. ex Naudin
Microlicia baccharoides Mart. ex Naudin
Microlicia bahiensis Markgr.
Microlicia balsamifera Mart.
Microlicia baumgratziana A.B.Martins & Koschn.
Microlicia benthamiana Triana
Microlicia blanchetiana Cogn.
Microlicia canastrensis Naudin
Microlicia candolleana R.Romero & Versiane
Microlicia cardiophora Naudin
Microlicia carrasci Markgr.
Microlicia castrata Naudin
Microlicia catolensis Woodgyer & Zappi
Microlicia cerifera (Gardner) A.B.Martins & Almeda
Microlicia chrysantha Wurdack
Microlicia ciliatoglandulosa R.Romero
Microlicia cinerea Cogn.
Microlicia cipoana Hoehne
Microlicia cogniauxiana R.Romero
Microlicia comparilis Wurdack
Microlicia confertiflora Naudin
Microlicia contasensis Woodgyer & Zappi
Microlicia cordata Cham.
Microlicia crassa R.Romero
Microlicia crebropunctata Pilg.
Microlicia crenulata Mart.
Microlicia cryptandra Naudin
Microlicia curralensis Brade
Microlicia cuspidifolia Mart. ex Naudin
Microlicia damazioi Brade
Microlicia decussata Naudin
Microlicia denudata Cogn.
Microlicia doryphylla Naudin
Microlicia edmundoi Brade
Microlicia elegans Naudin
Microlicia euphorbioides Mart.
Microlicia fasciculata Mart.
Microlicia flava R.Romero
Microlicia flavovirens Woodgyer & Zappi
Microlicia formosa Cham.
Microlicia fulva Cham.
Microlicia furnensis R.Romero
Microlicia giuliettiana A.B.Martins & Almeda
Microlicia glandulifera Cogn.
Microlicia glazioviana Cogn.
Microlicia graveolens DC.
Microlicia guanayana Wurdack
Microlicia harleyi Wurdack
Microlicia hatschbachii Wurdack
Microlicia helvola Triana
Microlicia hirsutissima Naudin
Microlicia hirticalyx R.Romero & Woodgyer
Microlicia humilis Naudin
Microlicia inquinans Naudin
Microlicia insignis Cham.
Microlicia isophylla DC.
Microlicia isostemon Wurdack
Microlicia jungermannioides DC.
Microlicia juniperina A.St.-Hil.
Microlicia leucantha Naudin
Microlicia leucopetala Wurdack
Microlicia linifolia Cham.
Microlicia longicalycina R.Romero
Microlicia longipedicellata Almeda & A.B.Martins
Microlicia longisepala Wurdack
Microlicia luetzelburgii Markgr.
Microlicia lutea Markgr.
Microlicia macedoi L.B.Sm. & Wurdack
Microlicia macrophylla Naudin
Microlicia maculata R.Romero
Microlicia martiana O.Berg ex Triana
Microlicia melanostagma Pilg.
Microlicia mendoncaei Cogn.
Microlicia microphylla Cogn.
Microlicia minima Markgr.
Microlicia monticola Wurdack
Microlicia morii Wurdack
Microlicia mucugensis (Wurdack) Almeda & A.B.Martins
Microlicia multicaulis Mart.
Microlicia myrtifolia Naudin
Microlicia myrtoidea Cham.
Microlicia naudiniana R.Romero
Microlicia neglecta Cogn.
Microlicia nervosa R.Romero
Microlicia noblickii (Wurdack) A.B.Martins & Almeda
Microlicia obtusifolia Cogn. ex R.Romero
Microlicia occidentalis Naudin
Microlicia oligochaeta Wurdack
Microlicia ordinata (Wurdack) Almeda & A.B.Martins
Microlicia oxyanthera Naudin
Microlicia pabstii Brade
Microlicia parvula (Markgr.) Koschn. & A.B.Martins
Microlicia peruviana Cogn.
Microlicia petasensis Wurdack
Microlicia petiolulata Cogn. ex R.Romero & Woodgyer
Microlicia pilosissima Cogn.
Microlicia pinheiroi Wurdack
Microlicia plumosa Woodgyer & Zappi
Microlicia polystemma Naudin
Microlicia psammophila Wurdack
Microlicia pseudoscoparia Cogn.
Microlicia ramosa Pilg.
Microlicia regeliana Cogn.
Microlicia riedeliana Cogn.
Microlicia rotundifolia Ule
Microlicia schreinerii Schwacke & Cogn.
Microlicia scoparia DC.
Microlicia semiriana Koschn. & A.B.Martins
Microlicia serrulata Cham.
Microlicia setosa DC.
Microlicia sickii Brade
Microlicia sincorensis Mart.
Microlicia souzae-limae Brade
Microlicia sphagnicola Gleason
Microlicia subaequalis Wurdack
Microlicia subalata Wurdack
Microlicia sublaevis Cogn.
Microlicia suborbicularifolia Hoehne
Microlicia subsetosa DC.
Microlicia sulfurea Hoehne
Microlicia taxifolia Naudin
Microlicia tenuifolia R.Romero
Microlicia ternata Cogn.
Microlicia tomentella Naudin
Microlicia torrandii Brade
Microlicia trembleyaeformis Naudin
Microlicia trichocalycina DC.
Microlicia vernicosa (Pedersoli) A.B.Martins & Almeda
Microlicia vestita DC.
Microlicia viminalis Triana
Microlicia viscosa Cogn.
Microlicia warmingiana Cogn.
Microlicia weddellii Naudin
Microlicia wurdackiana Almeda & A.B.Martins

References

Melastomataceae
Melastomataceae genera
Taxa named by David Don